Mitry-Mory is a commune in the Seine-et-Marne department in the Île-de-France region in north-central France. It is located in the north-eastern suburbs of Paris  from the center just off the N2 national highway.

About one-sixth of Charles de Gaulle Airport (CDG) (essentially runways and taxiways) lies on the territory of the commune of Mitry-Mory—mostly at the end of the runway. The construction of CDG caused the closure of the prewar Mitry-Mory airfield in the late 1960s. From the air, the most prominent feature, aside from farmland, is the Great circle (or round-about) of Rue de la Garenne, a feature which forms a wagon wheel like structure with spokes forming a cross in which a crucifix building is surrounded by another inter-circle round-about. It is also a major railroad centre. Another very prominent feature is a huge parking lot for such a small commune.

Many of the streets and roads are named for famous people: Mozart, Guy-Lussac, Léon Foucault, Berlioz, Picasso, Gauguin among others — some of whom actually visited there.

Mitry-Mory is very convenient to Paris and a less expensive place to live for those who work in Paris but prefer the commute by train or road.

Twin towns
It is twinned with the English town of Prudhoe in Northumberland.

History
The commune of Mitry-Mory was created in 1839 by the merger of the commune of Mitry with the commune of Mory. The commune town hall (mairie) is located in Mitry. The Commune Church contains a very important Pipe Organ which survived the French Revolution and was used by Gene Bedient as a model in his studies of French Organs to build similar ones in the United States.

Demographics
Inhabitants are called Mitryens.

Transportation
The Commune shares an RER station with the neighboring commune of Villeparisis on the RER B line with the Villeparisis–Mitry-le-Neuf station. It is also served by Mitry–Claye station, which is an interchange station on Paris RER line B and on the Transilien Paris-Nord suburban rail line. The commune is an important rail center.

Education
Schools in the commune include:
Preschools (écoles maternelles)
Acacias: Guy Môquet and Vincent van Gogh
Bourg: Anne-Claude Godeau and Jacqueline Quatremaire
Mitry-le-Neuf: Elsa Triolet, Emile Zola, and Jean de la Fontaine
Primary schools:
Acacias: Guy Môquet and Vincent van Gogh
Bourg: François Couperin and Jean-Moulin
Mitry-le-Neuf: Irène et Frédéric Joliot-Curie, Henri Barbusse, and Noël Fraboulet
Junior high schools: Collège Paul Langevin in Mory/Acacias and Collège Erik Satie in Mitry-le-Neuf
Lycée Honoré de Balzac in Mory/Acacias, a senior high school/sixth-form college

See also
Communes of the Seine-et-Marne department

References

External links

Official website 
1999 Land Use, from IAURIF (Institute for Urban Planning and Development of the Paris-Île-de-France région) 

Communes of Seine-et-Marne